Natalio Hernández Hernández (born 27 July 1947), also known as Natalio Hernández Xocoyotzin and by the pseudonym José Antonio Xokoyotsij, is a Mexican Nahua intellectual and poet, from Lomas del Dorado, Ixhuatlan de Madero the state of Veracruz. He is a founder of the Asociación de los Escritores en Lenguas Indígenas (AELI, Association of Writers in Indigenous Languages), the  Casa de los Escritores en Lenguas Indígenas (CELI, House of Writers in Indigenous Languages), and the Alianza Nacional de Profesionales Indígenas Bilingües (or ANPIBAC, National Alliance of Indigenous Bilingual Professionals). Since 2013 he is a corresponding member of the Academia Mexicana de la Lengua, the Mexican Language Academy.

Hernández was born 1947 in Naranjo Dulce, a small settlement in the municipality of Ixhuatlán de Madero, Veracruz.

Works
Xochikoskatl (1985)
Sempoalxóchitl / Veinte flores: una sola flor (1987)
Ijkon ontlajtoj aueuetl / Así habló el ahuehuete (1989)
Canto nuevo de Anahuac (1994)
Papalocuicatl / Canto a las mariposas (1996)
in tlahtoli, in ohtli / la palabra, el camino: Memoria y destino de los pueblos indígenas (1998)
El despertar de nuestras lenguas: Queman tlachixque totlahtolhuan (2002)
Semanca huitzilin / Colibrí de la armonía / Hummingbird of Harmony (2005)

Notes

External links
 

1947 births
Mexican male poets
Mexican male writers
Nahua people
Nahuatl-language poets
Living people